The Man in the Iron Mask was a mysterious prisoner in France under the reign of Louis XIV.

Man in the Iron Mask may also refer to:

 The third part of the novel The Vicomte of Bragelonne: Ten Years Later by Alexandre Dumas
 "Man in the Iron Mask", a song by Billy Bragg originally released on the album Life's a Riot with Spy vs Spy
The Man in the Iron Mask (1923 film), a German silent film directed by Max Glass
The Man in the Iron Mask (1939 film), an American black-and-white film directed by James Whale
Le Masque de fer, a 1962 French film starring Jean Marais
The Man in the Iron Mask, a 1968 British TV series directed by Hugh David
The Man in the Iron Mask (1977 film), a British TV movie
The Man in the Iron Mask (1985 film), an Australian animated TV film
The Man in the Iron Mask (1998 film), a British/American film directed by Randall Wallace
The Man in the Iron Mask, also known as The Mask of Dumas, a 1998 American film directed by William Richert

See also
 Iron Mask (disambiguation)